Al Jabalayn (also El Jebelein) is a town in central Sudan lying on the east bank of the River Nile.

It is served by a branch of the Sudan Railways where it is a terminus.
On the 28–29th of December 1989, the "Al Jabaylin Massacre" took place in here.
The Government believes that about 150 - 250 were killed while local authorities estimate 4000 people died. The town was once part of the Collo Kingdom, belonging to the Collo people.

See also 

 Railway stations in Sudan
 Second Sudanese Civil War

References 

Populated places in White Nile (state)
Nile